Jerome is a town in Drew County, Arkansas, United States. The population was 39 at the 2010 census.

History

During World War II, Jerome was home to a Japanese American internment camp, the Jerome War Relocation Center (1942–1944), designed by Edward F. Neild of Shreveport, Louisiana, and later converted into a prison camp for captured German soldiers.

Geography
Jerome is located in the southeast corner of Drew County at  (33.399139, -91.467864), along U.S. Route 165, which leads north  to Dermott and south  to Montrose.

Demographics

As of the census of 2000, there were 46 people, 18 households, and 16 families residing in the city. The racial makeup of the city was 76.09% White, 6.52% Black or African American, 17.39% from other races. 17.39% of the population were Hispanic or Latino of any race.

There were 18 households, out of which 33.3% had children under the age of 18 living with them, 72.2% were married couples living together, 5.6% had a female householder with no husband present, and 11.1% were non-families. 11.1% of all households were made up of individuals, and 5.6% had someone living alone who was 65 years of age or older. The average household size was 2.56 and the average family size was 2.69.

In the city the population was spread out, with 17.4% under the age of 18, 6.5% from 18 to 24, 28.3% from 25 to 44, 28.3% from 45 to 64, and 19.6% who were 65 years of age or older. The median age was 44 years. For every 100 females, there were 109.1 males. For every 100 females age 18 and over, there were 100.0 males.

The median income for a household in the city was $29,167, and the median income for a family was $29,167. Males had a median income of $18,333 versus $28,125 for females. The per capita income for the city was $11,707. 3.6% of the population (no families) were living below the poverty line, including no one under eighteen years old and no one over age 64.

References

External links

Towns in Arkansas
Towns in Drew County, Arkansas
Populated places established in 1920
Populated places established in 1965